Seyidlər or Seidlyar or Seyidlar or Seyidler or Seydlyar
or Sejidler or Seytlar may refer to:
Seyidlər, Kalbajar, Azerbaijan
Seyidlər, Khachmaz, Azerbaijan
Seyidlər, Lachin, Azerbaijan
Seyidlər, Neftchala, Azerbaijan
Seyidlər, Saatly, Azerbaijan
Seyidlər, Salyan, Azerbaijan
Seyidlər, Samukh, Azerbaijan
Seyidlər, Zangilan, Azerbaijan
Seyidlər, Zardab
Seyidlər (40° 07' N 47° 51' E), Zardab, Azerbaijan
Seyidlər (40° 21' N 47° 29' E), Zardab, Azerbaijan
Aşağı Seyidlər, Azerbaijan
Yuxarı Seyidlər, Azerbaijan
Şeidlər, Azerbaijan
Seidlyar, Iran